The Junpai CX65 is a compact CUV produced by Junpai, a sub-brand of FAW Group.

History 
The vehicle was unveiled at Auto Shanghai in April 2017 and is being sold exclusively in China since April 2018. The CX65 is essentially the crossover estate version of the Junpai A50 saloon and uses the same platform.

The only engine available for the CX65 is a 1.5-litre engine.

References 

CX65
Front-wheel-drive vehicles
Crossover sport utility vehicles
2010s cars
Cars introduced in 2018